John L. Marion is an American auctioneer and philanthropist. He served as the Chairman of Sotheby's from 1975 to 1994.

Early life
John L. Marion was born in Gardiner, New York. His father, Louis J. Marion, was the President of Parke-Bernet Galleries. He graduated from Fordham University in New York City in 1956. He then served as a lieutenant in the United States Navy. He went on to study the decorative arts at Columbia University.

Career
He started his career as an auctioneer at Sotheby's in 1960. He became president in 1972 and Chairman in 1975. During the course of his career, he oversaw the sale of Irises by Vincent van Gogh for US$53.9 million, Yo Picasso for US$47.9 million and Au Lapin Agile for US$40.7 million (both of which by Pablo Picasso), as well as Interchange by Willem de Kooning for US$20.7 million, and False Start for US$17 million and Two Flags US$12.1 million (both of which are by Jasper Johns).

In 1989, with Christopher Andersen, he co-wrote, The Best of Everything: The Insider's Guide to Collecting--For Every Taste and Every Budget, published by Simon & Schuster. The book suggests anyone can attend auctions and become a collector, even on a limited budget.

He retired in 1994. He still serves on its Advisory Board.

Philanthropy
The John L. Marion Chair in Art History, Painting, and Sculpture at Fordham University is named in his honor. It was endowed by the Burnett Foundation, where he serves on the Board of Trustees.

Personal life
He was the fourth husband of philanthropist Anne Windfohr Marion. They were married at the Church of the Heavenly Rest on the Upper East Side in Manhattan, New York City, in 1988. The ceremony was performed by Reverend C. Hugh Hildesley.  His wife passed in November 2020.

References

Living people
People from Ulster County, New York
People from the Upper East Side
Fordham University alumni
Columbia University alumni
American chief executives
Philanthropists from New York (state)
American auctioneers
Year of birth missing (living people)